Ypsolopha sasayamana is a moth of the family Ypsolophidae. It has been found in Japan.

References

Ypsolophidae
Moths of Japan